The 1994 Wimbledon Championships was a tennis tournament played on grass courts at the All England Lawn Tennis and Croquet Club in Wimbledon, London in the United Kingdom. It was the 108th edition of the Wimbledon Championships and were held from 20 June to 3 July 1994.

Prize money
The total prize money for 1994 championships was £5,682,170. The winner of the men's title earned £345,000 while the women's singles champion earned £310,000.

* per team

Champions

Seniors

Men's singles

 Pete Sampras defeated  Goran Ivanišević, 7–6(7–2), 7–6(7–5), 6–0
 It was Sampras' 5th career Grand Slam singles title and his 2nd (consecutive) title at Wimbledon.

Women's singles

 Conchita Martínez defeated  Martina Navratilova, 6–4, 3–6, 6–3
 It was Martínez's 1st and only career Grand Slam singles title. She became the 1st Spanish woman to win the Wimbledon singles title.

Men's doubles

 Todd Woodbridge /   Mark Woodforde defeated  Grant Connell /  Patrick Galbraith, 7–6(7–3), 6–3, 6–1
 It was Woodbridge's 6th career Grand Slam title and his 2nd Wimbledon title. It was Woodforde's 7th career Grand Slam title and his 2nd Wimbledon title.

Women's doubles

 Gigi Fernández /  Natasha Zvereva defeated  Jana Novotná /  Arantxa Sánchez Vicario, 6–4, 6–1
 It was Fernández's 12th career Grand Slam title and her 3rd Wimbledon title. It was Zvereva's 13th career Grand Slam title and her 4th Wimbledon title.

Mixed doubles

 Todd Woodbridge /  Helena Suková defeated  T. J. Middleton /  Lori McNeil, 3–6, 7–5, 6–3
 It was Woodbridge's 7th career Grand Slam title and his 3rd Wimbledon title. It was Suková's 11th career Grand Slam title and her 4th Wimbledon title.

Juniors

Boys' singles

 Scott Humphries defeated  Mark Philippoussis, 7–6(7–5), 3–6, 6–4

Girls' singles

 Martina Hingis defeated  Jeon Mi-ra, 7–5, 6–4

Boys' doubles

 Ben Ellwood /  Mark Philippoussis defeated  Vladimír Pláteník /  Ricardo Schlachter, 6–2, 6–4

Girls' doubles

 Nannie de Villiers /  Lizzie Jelfs defeated  Corina Morariu /  Ludmila Varmužová, 6–3, 6–4

Singles seeds

Men's singles
  Pete Sampras (champion)
  Michael Stich (first round, lost to Bryan Shelton)
  Stefan Edberg (second round, lost to Kenneth Carlsen)
  Goran Ivanišević (final, lost to Pete Sampras)
  Jim Courier (second round, lost to Guy Forget)
  Todd Martin (semifinals, lost to Pete Sampras)
  Boris Becker (semifinals, lost to Goran Ivanišević)
  Sergi Bruguera (fourth round, lost to Michael Chang)
  Andriy Medvedev (fourth round, lost to Boris Becker)
  Michael Chang (quarterfinals, lost to Pete Sampras)
  Petr Korda (second round, lost to Markus Zoecke)
  Andre Agassi (fourth round, lost to Todd Martin)
  Cédric Pioline (first round, lost to Brett Steven)
  Marc Rosset (second round, lost to Wayne Ferreira)
  Yevgeny Kafelnikov (third round, lost to Daniel Vacek)
  Arnaud Boetsch (first round, lost to Andrei Olhovskiy)

Women's singles
  Steffi Graf (first round, lost to Lori McNeil)
  Arantxa Sánchez Vicario (fourth round, lost to Zina Garrison-Jackson)
  Conchita Martínez (champion)
  Martina Navratilova (final, lost to Conchita Martínez)
  Jana Novotná (quarterfinals, lost to Martina Navratilova)
  Kimiko Date (third round, lost to Larisa Neiland)
  Mary Pierce (withdrew before the tournament began)
  Natasha Zvereva (first round, lost to Mana Endo)
  Lindsay Davenport (quarterfinals, lost to Conchita Martínez)
  Gabriela Sabatini (fourth round, lost to Lindsay Davenport)
  Mary Joe Fernández (third round, lost to Naoko Sawamatsu)
  Anke Huber (second round, lost to Inés Gorrochategui)
  Zina Garrison-Jackson (quarterfinals, lost to Gigi Fernández)
  Amanda Coetzer (fourth round, lost to Larisa Neiland)
  Sabine Hack (first round, lost to Florencia Labat)
  Magdalena Maleeva (second round, lost to Yayuk Basuki)
  Helena Suková (fourth round, lost to Martina Navratilova)

References

External links
 Official Wimbledon Championships website

 
Wimbledon Championships
Wimbledon Championships
June 1994 sports events in the United Kingdom
July 1994 sports events in the United Kingdom